(The Happy Deception) is an opera buffa in two acts by Gaetano Donizetti, to a libretto by Andrea Leone Tottola.  Composed in 1823, it was first given on September 3 of that year at the Teatro Nuovo in Naples.  It was not a success, and has disappeared from the repertory.

Composition
Donizetti composed the opera during the summer of 1823, during which time his Alfredo il grande was in rehearsals at the Teatro San Carlo.  It failed after three performances, and was not seen again for many years. It was revived in 1998 by the Festival della Valle d'Itria, a performance which has been recorded.

The opera's musical numbers are separated by spoken dialogue.

Roles

Plot

The opera takes place in Italy, sometime during the nineteenth century.

Lattanzio Lattrughelli's opera company is in the process of rehearsing a new work, with the usual mishaps. His wife's niece, Eugenia, is in love with a young cavalry lieutenant, Edoardo, who loves her back.  But his uncle, Colonel Franceschetti, refuses to consent to the marriage of his nephew with an actress.  Aurelia, Eugenia's aunt and Lattanzio's wife, pretends to be a countess, and in the "happy deception" of the title, deceives the Colonel into believing she loves him, and in so doing persuades him to accept the union of the two young people. When he finds out that he has been tricked, the Colonel reacts angrily before agreeing to their wedding, and all ends happily.

Recordings
A recording of the opera made during its performances at the Festival dalla Valle d'Istria was released by Dynamic in 1999. Its cast includes Domenico  Colaianni, Stefania Donzelli, Magali Damonte, Eun-Joo Lee, Madia Todisco, and Nicolas Rivenq, under the direction of Arnold Bosman.

References

External links
 
 Complete libretto

1823 operas
Italian-language operas
Operas by Gaetano Donizetti
Opera buffa
Operas
Operas set in Italy
Libretti by Andrea Leone Tottola